The 1905 AAA National Motor Car Championship consisted of 11 points-paying races, beginning in The Bronx, New York on June 10 and concluding in Poughkeepsie, New York on September 29. There were also at least two non-championship events held during the year. This was the first year that the AAA Contest Board (then known as the Racing Board) officially recognized a National Champion in American Championship Car competition.

The 1905 AAA National Champion was Barney Oldfield. For reasons unclear, but likely due to a change in attitudes and opinions by AAA officials about the dangers of racing following several serious accidents, no national championship was officially recognized again until 1916.

Schedule and results 
All races running on Dirt Oval.

Leading National Championship standings 

In 1951, Victor Hémery, winner of the 1905 Vanderbilt Cup, was retroactively awarded a national championship.

References

Works cited

Footnotes

External links 
 Compilation of articles on "The Lost Championship of 1905"

AAA Championship Car season
AAA Championship Car
AAA Championship Car